Commodity product Markup Language (CpML) is an industry standard used in wholesale energy trading. CpML is an XML-based business mark-up language used for interoperable representation of energy trades for the purpose of post-deal-execution processes like deal confirmation and regulatory reporting.

History and governance 
CpML 5.0 was first announced in 2013, and is based on previous standards created by European Federation of Energy Traders (EFET). CpML is governed by the CpML Foundation, a foundation under Dutch law created in 2014.

The Governance Board of the CpML Foundation consisted initially of representatives of EDF Trading, Freepoint Commodities Europe, Gazprom Marketing & Trading, RWE Supply & Trading and EFET.

References

External links 
 Official website of the CpML Foundation
 CpML pages on the website of the EFET

Market data
Metadata
Industry-specific XML-based standards
Electronic trading systems
Financial markets
Commodity markets
Energy markets